Still Waters is the twenty-first and penultimate studio album by the pop group the Bee Gees, released on 10 March 1997 in the UK by Polydor Records, and on 6 May the same year in the US by A&M Records.

Background
In 1994, the Bee Gees and Polydor Records had planned a major tour to promote Size Isn't Everything (1993) but it was postponed in February the same year due to Barry Gibb's trouble with arthritis in his back, right hand and right knee. Following the cancellation of the tour, Robin Gibb told the press that the group was working on an album of acoustic versions of songs they had written for other artists. The project was later called Love Songs, which featured some new recordings and was announced as the Bee Gees' new album in September 1994 and planned for release on 14 February (Valentine's Day) of 1995. However, their record company rejected the album.

Around 1994, the Bee Gees did record six songs, one of which was called "Miracles Happen" which was written and recorded to be the title song for a new film version of Miracle on 34th Street; the Bee Gees got the job in June 1994 and quickly returned this recording, with a boys’ choir and a big string section backing them. The filmmakers however decided later to use only old Christmas songs. On the same session, they also did their own version of their compositions such as "Emotion" (Samantha Sang), "Heartbreaker" (Dionne Warwick), "Love Never Dies" and "Rings Around the Moon", which were later released as B-sides.

Recording
In July 1995, they started with seven demos for what would become included on the album, along with four demos recorded in the second quarter of 1995. In the October 1995 sessions they recorded their rendition of "Will You Love Me Tomorrow" for a Carole King tribute album Tapestry Revisited: A Tribute to Carole King.

In March 1996, they relocated to The Hit Factory in New York to record two songs. Around 1996, the Bee Gees used session musicians to complete the entire album, produced by Russ Titelman. Also in 1996, the Bee Gees recorded two songs with two members of P.M. Dawn, Attrel Cordes and Jarett Cordes. The producer on "With My Eyes Closed" was Raphael Saadiq. "Still Waters (Run Deep)" was produced by Hugh Padgham. The last song recorded for the album was "Closer than Close" which features Maurice Gibb's lead vocals produced by the brothers themselves.

Release and Reception

The Bee Gees recorded further new songs in 1996 and 1997, and Still Waters was released in March 1997. Though receiving lukewarm reviews from critics, the album was their most successful album in almost twenty years; it was released at a time when the Bee Gees were being awarded for lifetime achievements, had recently been inducted into the Rock and Roll Hall of Fame and were regaining high exposure on television, particularly VH1. The album peaked at No. 2 on the UK Albums Chart and No. 11 in the United States. The Bee Gees made the album with a variety of top producers, including Russ Titelman, David Foster, Hugh Padgham, and Arif Mardin. The first single off the album, "Alone", was a worldwide hit, peaking at No. 5 in the UK and No. 28 in the United States, where it began as a "hot shot debut" at No. 34. "I Could Not Love You More" and "Still Waters (Run Deep)" also reached the UK top 20.

A reviewer for the newspaper Muzykalnaya Gazeta wrote: "There is life in the old dog yet! The water is still flowing in the river under the family name of Bee Gees! The brothers Barry, Maurice, and Robin Gibb did their best once again, for the umpteenth time, or rather to be even said, in their own style, as always."

In a special agreement with Target, Polydor also sold a special edition of the album which included a bonus CD of songs from their VH1 Storytellers concert. This CD has never been made commercially available outside of the Target agreement.

Aftermath
In 2003 Robin Gibb re-recorded the track "My Lover's Prayer" as a duet with Alistair Griffin. This reached No. 5 on the UK Singles Chart as a double A-side single with Griffin's solo recording of "Bring It On". It also appears on Griffin's debut album Bring It On, which reached No. 12 on the UK Albums Chart.

The album became one of the first of the Bee Gees' catalogue to be re-released on Reprise Records after the group regained the rights to all of their recordings in 2006.

Track listing
All songs written by Barry, Robin and Maurice Gibb.

Personnel
Barry Gibb – vocals, guitar, drum programming
Robin Gibb – vocals
Maurice Gibb – vocals, keyboards, guitar

Additional personnel

Alan Kendall – guitar
Steve Lukather – guitar
Mike Porcaro – bass guitar ("Alone")
Gregg Bissonette – drums ("Alone", "I Surrender")
Leland Sklar – bass guitar ("I Surrender")
Steve Porcaro – keyboards ("Alone")
David Paich – keyboards
David Foster – keyboards
Michael Thompson – guitar
Dean Parks – guitar
Steve Skinner – keyboards, synthesizer
Steve Jordan – drums
Robbie Kondor – keyboards
Jeff Bova – synthesizer bass, keyboards
Alan Clark – keyboards
Rob Mounsey – keyboard
 Marc Schulman – guitars
George "Chocolate" Perry – bass
Anthony Jackson – bass
Jimmy Bralower – programming, percussion
Dave Halpem – percussion
Ralph MacDonald – percussion
Russ Titelman – programming
David Elliot – drums
Raphael Saadiq – programming, bass, guitar, vocals
Kelvin Wooten – keyboards
Spanky Alford – guitar
Carl Verhyn – guitar
Joe Mardin – drum programming
Mike McAvoy – keyboards, guitar
Pino Palladino – bass
Peter John Vettese – keyboards, programming
Manu Katché – drums
Waddy Wachtel – guitar

Charts

Weekly charts

Year-end charts

Certifications

}
}

References

1997 albums
Albums produced by Barry Gibb
Albums produced by Robin Gibb
Albums produced by Maurice Gibb
Albums produced by Arif Mardin
Albums produced by David Foster
Albums produced by Hugh Padgham
Albums produced by Raphael Saadiq
Albums produced by Russ Titelman
Bee Gees albums
Polydor Records albums
A&M Records albums